Wiesława Lech (born 20 October 1946) is a Polish gymnast. She competed in six events at the 1968 Summer Olympics.

References

1946 births
Living people
Polish female artistic gymnasts
Olympic gymnasts of Poland
Gymnasts at the 1968 Summer Olympics
Sportspeople from Kraków
20th-century Polish women